The 1982 Scheldeprijs was the 69th edition of the Scheldeprijs cycle race and was held on 27 July 1982.

General classification

References

1982
1982 in road cycling
July 1982 sports events in Europe
1982 in Belgian sport